The Air Force Installation and Mission Support Center (AFIMSC), headquartered at Joint Base San Antonio-Lackland (JBSA-Lackland), Texas, is one of six centers aligned under Air Force Materiel Command for the United States Air Force. AFIMSC serves as the single intermediate-level headquarters responsible for providing installation and mission support to 77 Air Force installations, nine major commands and two direct reporting units with an annual budget of approximately $10 billion. The center comprises four directorates, 10 detachments, and four primary subordinate units, or PSUs. The AFIMSC cross-functional team provides globally integrated management, resourcing and combat support operations for Airmen and family services, base communications, chaplain, civil engineering, contracting, logistics readiness, public affairs, security forces and financial management programs.

History 

In 2013, United States Secretary of Defense Chuck Hagel directed service secretaries and chiefs to find inefficiencies across their headquarters organizations that will save 20 percent in total operating budgets. Then-Secretary of the Air Force Michael B. Donley and Chief of Staff of the Air Force Mark Welsh challenged their staffs to identify options to reduce overhead costs, increase efficiencies, eliminate redundant activities, and improve effectiveness and business processes to help meet the 20 percent reduction target.

The center was announced on July 11, 2014 as a result of Chuck Hagel's direction. Joint Base Andrews, Maryland served as the temporary headquarters during the base selection process. Joint Base San Antonio, Texas was selected to host AFIMSC Headquarters in January 2015, in large part due to 50 percent of AFIMSC's personnel resided at that base.

The center was activated on April 6, 2015 and reached initial operating capability on Oct. 1, 2015 and full operational capability in October 2016. The Air Force moved several field operating agencies under AFIMSC, including the Air Force Security Forces Center, Air Force Civil Engineer Center, Air Force Services Activity, Air Force Financial Management Center of Expertise, Air Force Financial Services Center, and Air Force Installation Contracting Agency.

Maj. Gen. Theresa Carter was announced as the center's provisional commander.  General Carter previously served as the special assistant to the commander of AFMC, developing the strategy and implementation plan for the AFIMSC. , the current commander is Maj. Gen. John T. Wilcox II.

Units 

AFIMSC currently comprises the following units:

 Air Force Installation and Mission Support Center (JBSA-Lackland)
 Detachment 1 (Peterson Space Force Base) - United States Space Force Support
 Detachment 2 (Joint Base Pearl Harbor–Hickam) - Pacific Air Forces Support
 Detachment 3 (Hurlburt Field) - Air Force Special Operations Command Support
 Detachment 4 (Ramstein Air Base) - United States Air Forces in Europe – Air Forces Africa Support
 Detachment 5 (Joint Base Andrews) - Air Force District of Washington Support
 Detachment 6 (Wright-Patterson Air Force Base) - Air Force Materiel Command Support
 Detachment 7 (JBSA-Randolph) - Air Education and Training Command Support
 Detachment 8 (Joint Base Langley-Eustis) - Air Combat Command Support
 Detachment 9 (Scott Air Force Base) - Air Mobility Command Support
 Detachment 10 (Barksdale Air Force Base) - Air Force Global Strike Command Support
 Air Force Civil Engineer Center (JBSA-Lackland)
 Air Force Security Forces Center (JBSA-Lackland)
 Air Force Services Center (JBSA-Lackland)
 Air Force Installation Contracting Center (Wright-Patterson Air Force Base)

 Expeditionary Support and Innovation Directorate
 Strategy and Innovation Division
 Expeditionary Support Division
 Installation Support Directorate
 Installation Engineering Division
 Protection Services Division
 Cyber Support Division
 Chaplain Corps Division
 Installation Deployment Division
 Airman & Family Services Division
 Mission Activity Integration Division
 Resources Directorate
 Resource Management Analysis Division
 Cost & Comparative Analysis Division
 Financial Operations Division
 Integration Division
 Planning and Programming Division

List of commanders

References

External links
Information from the Air Force

Centers of the United States Air Force